One Man Revolution is the 2007 debut album by The Nightwatchman, Tom Morello's acoustic alter ego. It was released on April 24, 2007.

Track listing

Credits
All songs performed by Tom Morello, with additional instruments by Brendan O'Brien
Produced by Brendan O'Brien
Recorded by Nick Didia at Buds Garage and Southern Tracks Recording, Atlanta, GA
Assisted by Tom Tapley, and at Henson Recording Studio, Los Angeles, CA – assistant Tom Syrowski

References

External links
 Official Site

2007 debut albums
Albums produced by Brendan O'Brien (record producer)
The Nightwatchman albums